Burak Kaplan (born 1 February 1990) is a Turkish-German former professional football midfielder who played as an attacking midfielder or left winger.

Club career
Kaplan made his Bundesliga debut on 11 December 2009 for Bayer Leverkusen against Hertha BSC. He scored the 2–1 go-ahead goal in the 90th minute, only to see the 2–2 equalizing goal be scored by the other club in the additional time. Subsequently, on 13 December 2009, he signed a professional contract with Leverkusen for three years until 2012.

In July 2014, his contract with Beşiktaş was dissolved and he joined German fourth tier Regionalliga West side Wattenscheid 09.

References

External links
 
 
 

1990 births
Living people
Footballers from Cologne
German footballers
Turkish footballers
Turkey youth international footballers
Turkey under-21 international footballers
Bundesliga players
2. Bundesliga players
Süper Lig players
3. Liga players
Regionalliga players
Association football midfielders
Bayer 04 Leverkusen players
Bayer 04 Leverkusen II players
SpVgg Greuther Fürth players
Beşiktaş J.K. footballers
SV Babelsberg 03 players
Fethiyespor footballers
KFC Uerdingen 05 players
SG Wattenscheid 09 players
FC Kray players